al-Tunisi (Arabic for "the Tunisian"), in Northern Africa usually spelled el-Tunsi, is an Arabic surname. Notable people with this name include:

 Ali ibn Ziyad al-Tunisi – full name of Ali ibn Ziyad
 Fathi al-Tunisi – alternative name for Abu Sayyaf (ISIL)
 Farouk al-Tunisi – alternative name for Abderraouf Jdey, a suspect leader of al Qaeda
 Mahmud Bayram el-Tunsi Egyptian poet (1893–1961)
 Ibn Ishaq al-Tunisi – Tunisian 13th-century astronomer
 Jalaluddin al-Tunisi - IS leader.
 Khair al-Din Pasha al-Tunisi – alternate name for Hayreddin Pasha, an Ottoman governor of Tunisia
 Nabilah al-Tunisi – Saudi engineer and businesswoman.
 Abu Nasr al-Tunisi – wanted by the FBI since 2002
 Abu Osama al-Tunisi (died 2007) – suspected leader of al Qaeda in Iraq.
 Abu Osama al-Tunisi (died 2016) – ISIS militant and "emir" of Manbij, Syria, killed on 9 June 2016.
 Abu Ubaydh al-Tunisi – suspected leader of al Qaeda
 Abu Yusif al-Tunisi – alternate name for Faker Boussora, a Canadian of Tunisian descent who faces a $5 million bounty